Jennifer Chung (born November 6, 1984) is a Canadian professional wrestler, manager and model, better known by her ring name Jade Chung.

Chung has appeared with professional wrestling promotions such as Border City Wrestling, IWA Mid-South, Ring of Honor and Pro Wrestling Guerrilla. Wrestlers she has managed include Frankie Kazarian, Jimmy Rave, Nate Mattson, Conrad Kennedy III, A-1, Scorpio Sky, Mr. Hughes and Shane Douglas.

Modeling career
Born in Guelph, Ontario of Chinese Vietnamese descent, Chung started modeling at the age of 12 as a runway model and appeared in cover stories for several fashion magazines while modeling in Vietnam. In 2002, she won the "Cover Girl" title from the Vietnamese fashion magazine Thoi Moi in 2002 and appeared on the cover of two other Vietnamese fashion magazines the following year. Chung was also one of 500 models selected to represent ImportFest 2003 in Toronto and was a top ten finalist in the 2004 Miss Viet Canada Pageant. She also starred as an extra in Ashanti's "Rain on Me" music video.

Professional wrestling career

Early career 
A wrestling fan as a child, she often watched the World Wrestling Federation well into high school. Chung was encouraged to enter professional wrestling after meeting Beth Phoenix and Traci Brooks at a local wrestling event and spent her summers training at Rob Fuego's Toronto-based wrestling school Squared Circle Training. Having some personal friends already in professional wrestling, she later attended local independent shows in hopes of getting hired full-time.

She eventually made her professional debut for wrestler/promoter Scott D'Amore's Border City Wrestling where, in September 2003, she managed "Franchise" Shane Douglas to win the BCW Can-Am Heavyweight Championship from D-Lo Brown. She would spend the next two years in various independent promotions in Canada and the United States. At A Night of Appreciation for Sabu, she was in the corner of A-1 when he defeated D-Lo Brown to win the BCW Can-Am Heavyweight Championship in Belleville, Michigan on December 12, 2004.

Ring of Honor

In early 2005, Jade Chung made her debut in Ring of Honor as a valet for manager Prince Nana's stable The Embassy replacing Angel Williams. Although part of one of the top factions in the promotion, Chung was used as a footstool for members of the stable, particularly Jimmy Rave. She was in the corner of Jimmy Rave when he defeated CM Punk in a dog collar match at Manhattan Mayhem on May 31. During the match, she was one of several members of The Embassy to interfere in the match and, at one point, she had entered the ring to apply a sleeper hold on CM Punk.

After Jimmy Rave lost to Roderick Strong on October 1, Jade left The Embassy to become the manager of Generation Next in their feud with The Embassy. The following night, she interfered in a match between Jimmy Rave and Matt Sydal costing him the match. She continued to feud with rival manager Prince Nana and, during a match on October 29, she attacked him with a tilt-a-whirl DDT. On November 5, Ring of Honor announced that Chung had been attacked by an unidentified man in the parking lot. A still photo of Jimmy Rave was shown on November 19 attacking Chung and the promotion claimed that she was no longer involved in wrestling.

The feud was finally concluded at Steel Cage Warfare when she made a surprise appearance during the main event, an 8-man Steel Cage Warfare match between The Embassy (Jimmy Rave, Abyss, Alex Shelley and Prince Nana) vs. Generation Next (Roderick Strong, Matt Sydal, Austin Aries and Jack Evans). Chung, who appeared with bandages as a result of her attack by Jimmy Rave, distracted The Embassy long enough for Jack Evans to enter the match and perform a double moonsault off the top off the cage. After Generation Next defeated The Embassy, Chung used Jimmy Rave as her own footstool during the in-ring celebration after the match.

Pro Wrestling Guerrilla
In March 2006, she appeared as the manager of the Dark & Lovely (Human Tornado and Scorpio Sky). She also made an appearance at All Pro Wrestling's Gym Wars, being in the corner of B-Boy in his defeat against MPT, and for Battle Ground Wrestling with Scott Lost losing a match to Foob Dogg for a lifetime contract with the company. She also managed Joey Ryan in single matches during the same time in PWG.

On October 7, Chung participated in a "First Blood Handicap" match with Scorpio Sky, teaming as the Scorpio Sky Experience, to defeat Frankie Kazarian. A month later, her stable (Scorpio Sky, Chris Bosh, Scott Lost & Joey Ryan) lost an 8-man tag team match against Candice LeRae's team (Frankie Kazarian, Human Tornado, El Generico and Quicksilver). She eventually turned on Scorpio Sky after he lost a "Loser Leaves PWG" match to Frankie Kazarian on January 27, 2007. At the NWA supercard Bloodlust! 3, she and Kitana Vera defeated Candice LeRae & Carla Jade in a tag team match in Covina, California on November 9.

She continued to appear with Scott Lost & Joey Ryan and was in their corner at the first supercard for Pro Wrestling Guerrilla as they faced The Age of the Fall (Tyler Black and Jimmy Jacobs) at PWG All Star Weekend 6, Night 1 in Van Nuys, California on January 5, 2008. On March 21, Chung was injured by Super Dragon during a tag team match between The Dynasty and Kevin Steen and El Generico. She was forced to take a leave of absence and, as a result, Scott Lost and Joey Ryan lost several opportunities to win the PWG Tag Team titles in matches against El Blazer and Kagetora and Los Luchas (Phoenix Star and Zokre).

References

External links

 

1984 births
Living people
21st-century professional wrestlers
Canadian female professional wrestlers
Canadian people of Chinese descent
Canadian people of Vietnamese descent
Professional wrestlers from Ontario
Professional wrestling managers and valets
Sportspeople from Guelph